Uzana of Toungoo was king of Toungoo from 1435 to 1436. After the death of his father in-law Thinkhaya III in 1435, he succeeded the throne of  the petty state of Toungoo (Taungoo), which had been in revolt of Ava since 1426. But his accession was contested by his brother-in-law Saw Oo, who sought assistance from King Binnya Ran I of Hanthawaddy. Less than a year into his reign, he was overthrown by Ran who came up with an army to Toungoo.

Uzana was treated relatively well by Ran, who was a brother-in-law by marriage. (They were married to the daughters of Thinkhaya III. Binnya Ran made Uzana chief of a few villages.) Unsatisfied Uzana fled soon after only to be caught by Hanthawaddy troops. At Pegu (Bago), Ran forgave Uzana, and made Uzana governor of the Kawliya region near Pegu. Later, Ran added Tharrawaddy to Uzana's portfolio.

Notes

References

Bibliography
 
 

Ava dynasty
Hanthawaddy dynasty
Year of birth unknown
Year of death unknown